Place du Portage is a large office complex in the Hull sector of Gatineau, Quebec, Canada, situated along Boulevard Maisonneuve and facing the Ottawa River. It is owned and occupied by the Federal Government of Canada.

Place du Portage consists of four phases which were built in different stages during the 1970s and early 80s. The office complex was built in order to revitalize Hull's decaying downtown core and also to increase the proportion of the federal workforce in the overall National Capital Region. Although the installation of thousands of jobs in the Hull and Gatineau area has resulted in significant economic benefits to local businesses and the real estate market, some people feel that the complex has transformed downtown Hull in some negative ways.  Much of the old downtown core was replaced with a series of massive towers and approximately 4,000 residents and businesses were displaced in the area that was once the town's main commercial area.

The whole complex (Place du Portage I, II, III, IV and Place d'Accueil) accommodates approximately 10,000 office workers. That makes Place du Portage the biggest office complex in the National Capital Region. Pedestrian bridges to city hall, which in turn has a pedestrian bridge to a hotel, makes this the center of a mini-"underground city".

Although it houses the Federal Government's Foreign Affairs, Trade and Development Canada (DFATD) on floors 4 through 12, it is commercially owned and operated, and not part of Place du Portage.

Place du Portage I

Place du Portage I is the second tallest office tower in Hull, after Terrasses de la Chaudière.

Place du Portage I accommodates approximately 1,200 office workers, between the Canadian Intellectual Property Office, and the Competition Bureau.

Place du Portage II
Place du Portage II is adjacent to Portage I and was completed in 1975.

Place du Portage II accommodates approximately 800 office workers.

Place du Portage III

The tallest section is 18 floors above grade with another 5 below-grade levels. It was completed in 1978.

Place du Portage III accommodates approximately 4,500 office workers, mostly Public Services and Procurement Canada staff.

In 2000, Phase III was named by the Royal Architectural Institute of Canada as one of the top 500 buildings produced in Canada during the last millennium.

Place du Portage IV

Place du Portage IV is the latest phase, completed in 1979.

Place du Portage IV accommodates approximately 3,500 office workers, almost exclusively Employment and Social Development Canada staff (which includes Service Canada staff).

See also
List of tallest buildings in Ottawa–Gatineau

Notes

External links

Official website
Place du Centre's Official website
Emporis

Buildings and structures in Gatineau
Shopping malls in Quebec
Canadian federal government buildings